Gymnopilus laricicola is a species of mushroom in the family Hymenogastraceae.

See also

List of Gymnopilus species

External links
Gymnopilus laricicola at Index Fungorum

laricicola
Fungi of North America